KBHJ is a radio station broadcasting a country music format on 97.3 FM to Blythe, California. It went on the air on February 2, 2017.

References

External links

2017 establishments in California
Country radio stations in the United States
Radio stations established in 2017
Blythe, California
BHJ